Nadia Assaf (born 30 September 1985) is a Lebanese football manager and former player who played as a midfielder and a centre forward. She is also a former futsal player, and represented Lebanon internationally in both football and futsal.

Early life
Born on 30 September 1985, in Dubai, United Arab Emirates to a Lebanese Druze family, Assaf was raised in Australia.

Club career
Assaf has played for several Lebanese Women's Football League clubs.

International career
Assaf has been capped for Lebanon at senior level in both football and futsal. In football, she represented Lebanon in multiple competitions, namely the 2011 WAFF Women's Championship and the 2014 AFC Women's Asian Cup qualification in 2013, where she played three games and scored two goals against Kuwait.

In futsal, Assaf played for Lebanon at the 2008 WAFF Women's Futsal Championship.

Personal life
Assaf has a Masters in Sports Education and Development from the University of Bath in England.

Career statistics

International
Scores and results list Lebanon's goal tally first, score column indicates score after each Assaf goal.

Honours
Lebanon
 WAFF Women's Championship third place: 2007

See also
 List of Lebanon women's international footballers

References

External links
 
 

1985 births
Living people
Sportspeople from Dubai
Lebanese women's footballers
Lebanese women's futsal players
Women's association football midfielders
Women's association football forwards
Lebanon women's international footballers
Lebanese football managers
Female association football managers
Women's association football managers
Lebanese Druze
Lebanese Women's Football League players